The Minskin is a breed of cat derived from intentional hybrid cross-breedings between the Munchkin and Burmese cat breeds, with the addition of Sphynx and Devon Rex.

The Minskin is short-legged with a very short coat. It is described as having a small to medium-sized semi-cobby muscular body, a rounded head, large ears that are wide at the base, a short broad muzzle with prominent whisker pads and eyes that are large and round, spaced well apart, giving them an open and alert expression. Their fur is a sparse coat, which is more dense on their outer extremities, giving them a unique coat description of "fur-points" that define the mask, ears, legs and tail, with a more sparsely coated cashmere-like torso.

Minskin cats are often described as exotic and alien-like, they are sweet tempered and affectionate cats that are playful but not destructive. They are a small breed that requires little grooming and gets along with other animals and humans.

History 
In 1998, Paul Richard McSorley began the development of the Minskin cat breed in Boston, Massachusetts. Just as the Siamese has color restricted to the points/extremities, Paul McSorley envisioned a cat with short legs and denser fur restricted to the points (fur-points) on the mask, ears, legs and tail, with a noticeably more sparsely coated torso, neck and belly.

To accomplish his goal, he crossed his already established Munchkin show cats with short legs with a full coat of fur. He then introduced and combined 'fuzzy' Sphynx for the hairless characteristic but with denser fur restricted to the extremities, making for a healthier immune system. For the appeal of structure, temperament, type and other desired qualities, he also used his International Award Winning Burmese cats and Devon Rex in the development of his Minskin breeding program. The first standard cat that met his goal was "TRT I Am Minskin Hear Me Roar", born in July 2000.

By early 2005 about 50 cats meeting the Minskin vision existed and were registered by The International Cat Association (TICA). In 2008, the Minskin became recognized as a Preliminary New Breed (PNB) and is currently in TICA's program that monitors the development of new breeds and their progress toward achieving the title of Advanced New Breed (ANB).

See also
List of experimental cat breeds

References

External links
Minskin Breed Introduction The International Cat Association.

Cat breeds
Cat breeds originating in the United States
Cat breeds and types with short legs
Hairless cat breeds